Jean-Jacques Louis Philippe Guerrier, Duke of L'Avance, Count of Mirebalais (December 19, 1757 – April 15, 1845) was a career officer and general in the Haitian Army who became President of Haïti on May 3, 1844. He died in office on April 15, 1845.

Early life
A respected soldier, Guerrier had successfully commanded the southern black army during the Haitian Revolution. After Haiti became independent, he retired from active service and became a plantation owner. King Henry I gave him the hereditary title of Duke of l'Avancé and Earl of Mirebalais.

Presidency
In 1844, discontent erupted among rural farmers and cultivators over economic conditions within the country. These disaffected groups formed bands of armed men known as "piquets". The piquets were gradually brought under the command of a former army officer, Louis Jean-Jacques Acaau, who used them to disrupt government control over the south of Haiti. Eventually, with their increasing success, the piquets acquired political aspirations. The foremost of these were the dismantling of mulatto power over the government and a return to black rule. These goals were believed to have been met when in May 1844, President Rivière-Hérard was removed from office by the mulatto hierarchy and replaced with the aged black general Philippe Guerrier, who assumed the presidency on May 3, 1844. Guerrier held office for only 11 months before he died on April 15, 1845.

References

Presidents of Haiti
Foreign Ministers of Haiti
Haitian independence activists
Haitian military leaders
1773 births
1845 deaths
People from Nord (Haitian department)

Mm